The Fleeting Ends are a rock band from Philadelphia, PA. The band consists of Matt Vantine (vocals, guitar), Lauren Davish (vocals, tambourine), Andrew Leingang (drums), Jim Ronca (keys), and Tim Ferguson (bass). Their sound has been described as "upbeat and poppy"  with an emphasis on two part vocal harmonies and catchy hooks.

The band was first created in late 2008, by Vantine and former member Matt Amadio. Soon after, they entered Milkboy Studios and recorded a self-titled, full-length record with producer Tommy Joyner. In early 2010, they started rehearsing with bassist Russell Langley, who then joined the group. February of that year saw the band making their first television appearance on NBC's The 10 Show. In March, the band was invited to perform at the South By Southwest festival in Austin, Texas.  After a few more shows and a radio performance on Radio 104.5 WRFF, the band was chosen as one of four finalists in The Philadelphia Songwriters Project Contest.  This gained them spots on some local music festivals, as well as an opening slot for Fountains Of Wayne.

In 2011, the band recorded an EP and single, both at Milkboy Studios. The song "Deceiver" from their debut was featured in the indie film Lebanon, PA.  Another appearance on Radio 104.5 WRFF followed that summer.

In Spring 2012, the band entered Milkboy Studios yet again to record a new full-length record titled, Our Eyes Are Peeled, with Tommy Joyner. The record was finished later that year, and was released in 2013. Radio station WXPN featured the band as part of their Unlocked series at the end of the year in which they reviewed the record favorably.  The song "Elaine (Until Now)", from the album, was featured in the showtime series Shameless (U.S. TV series) (season 4).

After a several year hiatus, the band revamped in 2018 with a new lineup shortly after the release of “I Know You Lie 'Coz So Do I”, with new members Lauren Davish, Andrew Leingang, and Jim Ronca, in addition to founding frontman Matt Vantine. The new lineup has been working on new music and became active in the later part of 2018.

References

Musical groups from Philadelphia
Indie rock musical groups from Pennsylvania